Timmy, or sometimes Timmie, is a masculine name, a short form of Timothy or Tim. This variation is popular as a nickname and is commonly used when someone is young, but is often used in adulthood. It is a version of the Greek name  (Timόtheos) meaning "one who honours God", from τιμή  "honour" and θεός "god". Tim (and its variations) is a common name in several countries.

People
 Timmy Allen (born 2000), an American basketball player
 Timmy Chang (born 1981), American college football coach and former quarterback
 Timmy Chipeco (born 1975), Filipino politician
 Timmy Dooley (born 1969), Irish politician
 Timmy Duggan (born 1982), American retired road racing cyclist
 Timmy Fitzpatrick, 1940s hurling goalkeeper
 Timmy Hammersley (born 1987), Irish hurler
 Timmy Hansen (born 1992), Swedish rallycross driver
 Timmy Hill (born 1993), American stock car racing driver 
 Timmy Horne (born 1997), American football player
 Timmy Jernigan (born 1992), American National Football League player
 Timmy Kelleher (born 1970), Irish retired hurler
 Timmy Mallett (born 1955), English TV presenter, broadcaster and artist
 Timmy Matley, lead singer of the British group the Overtones
 Timmy Murphy (born 1974), Irish jockey
 Timmy O'Dowd (born 1963), Irish Gaelic footballer
 Timmy Payungka Tjapangati (c. 1942–2000), Australian Aboriginal artist
 Timmy Pettersson (born 1977), Swedish ice hockey player
 Timmy Simons (born 1976), Belgian footballer
 Timmy Smith (born 1964), American former National Football League player
 Timmy Thiele (born 1991), German footballer
 Timmy Thomas (born 1944), American R&B singer, keyboardist, songwriter and record producer
 Timmy Trumpet, stage name of Australian house DJ and producer Timothy Jude Smith
 Timmy Williams (born 1981), American comedian and member of The Whitest Kids U' Know
 Timmy Yip (born 1967), film art director and designer

Fictional characters
 Timmy, a dog from The Famous Five series by Enid Blyton
 Timmy, a large green monster on The Muppet Show
 Timmy, a lamb from the animated television series Shaun the Sheep and its spin-off Timmy Time
 Timmy, a character from the animated television series Winx Club
 Timmy Baterman, a fictional character from Stephen King's novel Pet Semetary
 Timmy Brisby a young mouse in the 1982 film adaptation The Secret of NIMH
 Timmy Burch, a wheelchair-using character with a cognitive disability on the TV series South Park
 Timmy Lenox, on the soap opera Passions
 Timmy Martin, the boy who owns the dog Lassie in the long-running TV series Lassie
 Timmy Time, British children's TV character.
 The Adventures of Timmy the Tooth, animated children's TV character.
 Timmy Turner, from the animated television series The Fairly OddParents

Animals
 Timmy (gorilla) (1959–2011), a longtime resident of the Cleveland Metroparks Zoo

See also
 Timmie, given name
 Timme, given name and surname
 Timothy
 Tim (given name)
 Timo
 Timotheus
 Timothée
 Timothy (disambiguation)
 Tim (disambiguation)
 Timoti (disambiguation)
 Drew Timme (born 2000), American basketball player whose surname is pronounced "Timmy"

References

Given names of Greek language origin
Masculine given names
English given names
English masculine given names
Hypocorisms